Multi Rolle Radio (English: Multi Role Radio) is a modular radio set which supports high speed frequency hopping and strong encryption. It was ordered in early 1993 and first put to operative use in mid-1995.

It operates on standard military VHF frequencies ranging from 30.000 to 87.975 MHz.

The system was developed in Norway, mainly by Kongsberg Defence Communication and Thales Group Norway, with support from the Norwegian Defence Research Establishment. It has been exported to Hungary.

The radio is modular, and can be configured both as portable (PRC) and vehicle-mounted (VRC). The VRC can be fitted with two receive/transmit modules in a single mounting, for use as a relay.

Although most transmit specifications are classified, it is known that the radio uses Gaussian Minimum Shift Keying and M-ary encoding. It can also be used in an analog FM mode, in which it is compatible with other radios like AN/PRC-77 and civilian radios.

It has several features besides being a traditional radio set, amongst them message relaying of digital messages, cell area mobile capabilities and Digital Tadkom access.

The lighter, more mobile set for the Norwegian military is Lett Feltradio (Light multi role  radio). This is fully interoperable with MRR both in plain and encrypted mode.

Military radio systems
Norwegian Defence Research Establishment